Anviq (also Romanized as Anvīq and Anavīq; also known as Amvei and Amvey) is a village in Jushin Rural District, Kharvana District, Varzaqan County, East Azerbaijan Province, Iran. At the 2006 census, its population was 68, in 16 families.

References 

Towns and villages in Varzaqan County